Main Tera Boyfriend is a dance song recorded by Meet Bros, Arijit Singh, and Neha Kakkar. Lyrics by Jitendra Raghuvanshi . composed by Sohrabuddin .The music video of the song stars Sushant Singh Rajput and Kriti Sanon. The song is from the Indian film Raabta.

Music video 
The choreography was done by Ahmed Khan. It is a revamped version of J Star's 2015 chartbuster track "Na Na Na Na".

Synopsis

Media coverage
India's leading newspaper and portal, the Daily News and Analysis's Prachita Pandey wrote: "It's so refreshing to hear Arijit Singh crooning something fun and peppy after a series of heartbreaking/slow/soft romantic numbers. He proves yet again that he can sing any song with utmost perfection. Neha Kakkar complements him well, but we felt her vocals to be a bit toned down in terms of energy. Meet brothers too have sung some additional portions in the song."

"News18, described the song as the "Party Anthem of the Season".

Allegations of Plagiarism
Punjabi pop singer Jagdeep Singh, known by his stage name J-Star accused T-Series of recreating his song "Na Na Na Na" without his permission. He claimed that the label approached him to license the rights to the song but a dispute in the terms of the contract prevented it from going forward and T-Series eventually produced the song. T-Series responded with a statement saying that the song was a remake of a 2007 sing titled 
Girl Friend Boy Friend sung by Gopal Sharma  from album "Punjabi Blockbuster" that was produced by the label as part of a Punjabi-language compilation. The label further warned Singh against misleading people and stated that he should be thankful that no legal action was taken against him by them for infringement of the 2007 song.

References

2017 songs
Songs written for films
Hindi film songs
Arijit Singh songs
Songs with lyrics by Kumaar
Neha Kakkar songs